Eugène Beugré Yago (born 15 December 1969 ) is an Ivorian footballer. He played in 12 matches for the Ivory Coast national football team from 1989 to 1994. He was also named in Ivory Coast's squad for the 1994 African Cup of Nations tournament.

References

External links
 

1969 births
Living people
Ivorian footballers
Ivory Coast international footballers
1992 African Cup of Nations players
1994 African Cup of Nations players
Africa Cup of Nations-winning players
1992 King Fahd Cup players
Place of birth missing (living people)
Association footballers not categorized by position